Zsolt Makra (born 24 May 1982 in Szeged) is a Hungarian football defender playing for Békéscsaba 1912 Előre SE.

He had previously played with Vasas SC, Rákospalotai EAC, Győri ETO FC and Slovenian club NK Primorje. In 2008, he signed with Algyő SK, and after one year he moved to Békéscsaba 1912 Előre SE.

External links
 HLSZ 
 MLSZ 
 Stats from Hungarian Championship at Futball-Adattár
 Stats from Slovenia at PrvaLiga

1982 births
Living people
Sportspeople from Szeged
Hungarian footballers
Association football defenders
Vasas SC players
Rákospalotai EAC footballers
Győri ETO FC players
Algyő SK players
Békéscsaba 1912 Előre footballers
NK Primorje players
Orosháza FC players
Nemzeti Bajnokság I players
Hungarian expatriate footballers
Expatriate footballers in Slovenia
Hungarian expatriate sportspeople in Slovenia